Svetlana Zylin (1948-2002) was a Belgian-born Canadian theatre director and playwright. She was also the founder of the Women's Theatre Collective in Vancouver, British Columbia.

Biography 
Zylin was born in Belgium in 1948. Her family immigrated to Winnipeg, Manitoba, Canada in 1954.

Zylin attended the University of Manitoba and graduated in 1968 with Bachelor of Arts degree. Zylin later received an MFA from the University of British Columbia's directing program. For her MFA thesis, Zylin originally directed Federico García Lorca’s The House of Bemarda Alba with an all female cast. The production was deemed ineligible as her thesis production as her all female cast did not "reflect the human condition." Zylin then directed John Herbert’s Fortune in Men’s Eyes with an all-male cast which was deemed to meet the MFA requirements.

Zylin died in Winnipeg, Manitoba on July 15, 2002.

Career 
In 1972, Zylin founded the Women's Theatre Collective in Vancouver, British Columbia. From 1988 to 1991, Zylin ran the Playwright's Workshop in Montreal, Quebec.

Zylin created "Toronto's only continuing, improvised soap", A Wedge Of Night. A Wedge of Night ran in the late eighties at the Midtown Cafe Theatre Society (formerly the Ritz Cafe Theatre) in downtown Toronto and was a live, improvised soap opera. A Wedge of Night featured local actors such as Randy Parker, Sybille Forster, Bill Zaget, and Melanie Brown.

Zylin's play The Destruction of Eve premiered in 1998 with the Company of Sirens at the Annex Theatre in Toronto, Ontario. The Destruction of Eve is a feminist, musical take on the Bible and its female characters. The musical features music and lyrics by Connie Kaldor. The Company of Sirens premiere featured Ellen Rae Hennessy, Alex Fallis, Carol Greyeyes, Kathleen McAuliffe, Simrata Shakla and Shakura S'Aida.

In 1999, Zylin was appointed theatre and dance touring officer for the Manitoba Arts Council. The position was supposed to last for three years but was cut short due to Zylin's death. Zylin died in Winnipeg on July 15, 2002.

Select directorial credits 

 Rites of Passage - Great Canadian Theatre Company, 1978–79 season
 One on the Way - Mulgrave Road Theatre, 1980
 Requiem for August by Helen Posno - 1982 Rhubarb! Festival
 Signs of Life by Joan Schenkar - Nightwood Theatre
 Djuna: What Of The Night - Company of Sirens, 1991
 Last Rites by Leslie Hamson - Nakai Theatre Ensemble, Festival of the Yukon Arts Centre 1992
 The Suicide by Nikolai Erdman - Dalhousie Theatre Department, 1993

Plays 

 The Destruction of Eve - written by Svetlana Zylin, music and lyrics by Connie Kaldor
 Djuna: What Of The Night - co-created by Zylin and Cynthia Grant
 One on the Way - co-created by Zylin,  Mary Vingoe, Nicola Lipman, and Gay Hauser

References 

Canadian theatre directors
Canadian women dramatists and playwrights
University of Manitoba alumni
University of British Columbia alumni
20th-century Canadian women writers
Belgian expatriates in Canada
Feminist theatre
1948 births
2002 deaths
20th-century Canadian dramatists and playwrights